Ivan Milanov Dimitrov (14 May 1935 – 1 January 2019) was a Bulgarian footballer who played as a defender for the Bulgarian national team. At club level, he made 340 appearances in the Bulgarian League, playing for Stroitel Sofia, Torpedo Sofia, Zavod 12 Sofia, Lokomotiv Sofia, Spartak Sofia and Akademik Sofia. 

Dimitrov was capped 70 times for the Bulgaria national football team. He appeared in the 1962 and 1970 FIFA World Cups. He also competed in the men's tournament at the 1960 Summer Olympics. He died on 1 January 2019 at the age of 83.

Honours
Lokomotiv Sofia
Bulgarian League: 1963–64

Spartak Sofia
Bulgarian Cup: 1967–68

References

External links
 
 FIFA profile
 

1935 births
2019 deaths
Bulgarian footballers
Bulgaria international footballers
Association football defenders
FC Lokomotiv 1929 Sofia players
Akademik Sofia players
First Professional Football League (Bulgaria) players
1962 FIFA World Cup players
1970 FIFA World Cup players
Olympic footballers of Bulgaria
Footballers at the 1960 Summer Olympics